The Hochschule für Musik Würzburg (University of Music Würzburg) was founded in 1797 by Franz Joseph Fröhlich as Collegium musicum academicum (Academic college of music). From 1921 to 1973, it was named Bayerisches Staatskonservatorium der Musik (Bavarian State Conservatory of Music). The current name was given on 1 September 1973. 

It is located in three buildings. The number of full-time students was about 650 in 2007.

Subjects 

The university offers a Bachelor of Music degree in artistic and educational programs:

 accordion
 conducting
 voice
 guitar
 historical instruments
 jazz
 church music
 piano
 composition
 music theory
 orchestral instruments
 organ
 elementary music education

There are several graduate programs and the possibility of promotion. Musically gifted children and adolescents are specifically promoted by the university (musical ECI).

Faculty and alumni 
 Karl Muck (1859–1940), conductor
  (1908–1980), hornist
 Bertold Hummel (1925–2002), composer
 Siegfried Fink (1928–2006), percussionist and composer
  (1928–2016), composer
  (1936–2018), trombonist
 Klaus Hinrich Stahmer (born 1941), composer and musicologist
 Heinz Winbeck (1946–2019), composer
  (born 1956), composer and academic teacher
 Kolja Lessing (born 1961), violinist, pianist, composer and academic teacher
 Roland Böer (born 1970), conductor and festival manager
 Patrick Lange (born 1981), conductor
 Hong Jinho (born 1985), cellist and member of Hoppipolla
 Tobias Feldmann (born 1991), violinist, finalist of Elisabeth Competition

External links 

 
 

Hochschule für Musik Würzburg
1797 establishments in the Holy Roman Empire
18th-century establishments in Bavaria
Educational institutions established in 1797
Würzburg